Sohmaea is a genus of flowering plants belonging to the family Fabaceae.

Its native range is tropical and subtropical Asia. It is found in Andaman Islands, Assam, Bangladesh, Bismarck Archipelago, Borneo, China, East Himalaya, Hainan, India, Java, Laos, Lesser Sunda Islands, Malaya, Maluku, Myanmar, Nepal, New Guinea, Nicobar Islands, Pakistan, Philippines, Sulawesi, Sumatera, Taiwan, Thailand, Vietnam and West Himalaya.

It is listed as extinct in Sri Lanka.

The genus was circumscribed by Hiroyoshi Ohashi and Kazuaki K. Ohashi  in J. Jap. Bot. vol.93 on page 159 in 2018.

The genus name of Sohmaea is in honour of Kankichi Sohma (1926–1995), who was a Japanese botanist who worked at Tohoku University and was interested in analysis of pollen and Palynology (dust).

Species
As accepted by Kew;
Sohmaea barbaticaulis 
Sohmaea diffusa 
Sohmaea gracillima 
Sohmaea hispida 
Sohmaea lacei 
Sohmaea laxiflora 
Sohmaea teres 
Sohmaea zonata

References

Fabaceae
Fabaceae genera
Flora of tropical Asia